Gaetano Dalla Pria (born 24 January 1940 in Montebello Vicentino) is a former discus thrower from Italy.

Biography
In 1963, his best year, he won two medals at the International athletics competitions. He has 11 caps in national team from 1961 to 1964.

National titles
Gaetano Dalla Pria has won 2 times the individual national championship.
5 wins in the Discus throw (1962, 1964)

See also
 Italian all-time lists - Discus throw
 Italy national athletics team - More caps

References

External links
 

1940 births
Living people
Italian male discus throwers
Universiade medalists in athletics (track and field)
Mediterranean Games silver medalists for Italy
Mediterranean Games medalists in athletics
Athletes (track and field) at the 1963 Mediterranean Games
Universiade gold medalists for Italy